Mert Topuz (born 19 February 2001) is a Turkish professional footballer who plays as a goalkeeper for Ankaragücü.

Professional career
A youth product of Ankaragücü since 2013, Topuz signed his first professional contract with Ankaragücü in 2020. He made his professional debut with Ankaragücü in a 1–0 Süper Lig loss to Alanyaspor on 15 May 2021.

References

External links
 
 

2001 births
Living people
People from Yerköy
Turkish footballers
MKE Ankaragücü footballers
Ankara Demirspor footballers
Süper Lig players
Association football goalkeepers